The International Bowling Museum is located inside the International Bowling Campus in Arlington, Texas. It reopened there on January 26, 2010, after having been located in St. Louis, Missouri, until November 2008. The design and fabrication of the new facility was awarded to Museum Arts Inc., a Dallas company.  

The World Bowling Writers (WBW) International Bowling Hall of Fame and United States Bowling Congress Hall of Fame are at this location, along with many exhibits on both the history of bowling and its current status as the nation's No. 1 participatory sport.

See also
 List of museums in North Texas
 United States Bowling Congress

External links
Map: 
International Bowling Museum and Hall of Fame website.

Ten-pin bowling
Sports museums in Texas
Museums in Tarrant County, Texas
Culture of Arlington, Texas
Museums established in 2010
Buildings and structures in Arlington, Texas
Sports in Arlington, Texas
2010 establishments in Texas